The 1983–84 season was the 69th season of the Isthmian League, an English football competition.

Harrow Borough were champions, winning their first Isthmian League title. There was no promotion from the Isthmian League to the Alliance Premier League till 1985. Windsor & Eton finished first in Division One achieving the second promotion in a row. Corinthian-Casuals were excluded from the league after new groundsharing ruled were introduced.

At the end of the season Division Two was split into two sections after 19 clubs, mainly from the Athenian League joined Division Two. Thus, the Athenian League was finally absorbed by Isthmian League.

Premier Division

The Premier Division consisted of 22 clubs, including 20 clubs from the previous season and two new clubs, promoted from Division One:
Harlow Town
Worthing
Also, at the end of the previous season Leytonstone & Ilford changed name into Leytonstone/Ilford.

At the end of the season Staines Town were demoted to Division One due to ground grading, thus, Tooting & Mitcham United were reprieved.

League table

Division One

Division One consisted of 22 clubs, including 18 clubs from the previous season and four new clubs:

Two clubs relegated from the Premier Division:
Leatherhead
Woking

Two clubs promoted from Division Two:
Clapton
Windsor & Eton

League table

Division Two

Division Two consisted of 22 clubs, including 19 clubs from the previous season and three new clubs:

Grays Athletic, joined from the Athenian League
Newbury Town, joined from the Athenian League
St Albans City, relegated from Division One

Before the start of the season Dorking Town was renamed Dorking.

At the end of the season Corinthian Casuals were excluded from the league, while Division Two was split into Division Two North and Division Two South with a number of the Athenian League clubs joining.

League table

References

Isthmian League seasons
I